Fathiabad-e Chaleh Chaleh (also Romanized as Fatḩīābād-e Chāleh Chāleh and Fatḩīābād-e Chā Chāleh) is a village in Mirbag-e Shomali Rural District, in the Central District of Delfan County, Lorestan Province, Iran. At the 2006 census, its population was 23, in 6 families.

References 

Towns and villages in Delfan County